Afanasy Bagration (At'anase Bagrationi; , Afanasiy Leonovich Bagration), born Adarnase (ადარნასე) (15 November 1707 – 31 March 1784) was a Georgian prince royal (batonishvili) of the Bagrationi dynasty of House of Mukhrani of Kartli and a natural son of Levan of Kartli by a concubine. He followed, in 1724, his half-brother King Vakhtang VI of Kartli in an exile to the Russian Empire, where Afanasy pursued a military career and attained to the rank of general poruchik.

Career 
Afanasy Bagration, born Adarnase, was a natural son of Levan (Shah Quli Khan), prince-regent of Kartli in eastern Georgia and a titular king in 1709. His early life in Kartli is poorly documented. In 1724, he arrived in Russia in the entourage of his half-brother Vakhtang VI (Husayn Quli Khan), who had lost his throne to the Ottoman invasion. Adarnase, now known as Afanasy, joined the Imperial Russian Army and in succeeding years rose through the ranks. He was a colonel in the Viatsky Infantry Regiment and then a major-general in 1755. He carried out a variety of assignments during the Seven Years' War (1756–1763). He was decorated with the Order of St. Anna in 1762 and promoted to general poruchik (an equivalent to lieutenant general) in 1763. From 1763 to 1764, Prince Bagration, filling the office of ober-commandant of Moscow, was in charge of a garrison of that city. He took part in the pacification of the Plague Riot in September 1771 and barely escaped from being stoned by the mob at the Moscow Kremlin. Prince Afanasy died in Moscow in 1784, aged 76. He was buried at the Donskoy Monastery in Moscow.

Family and ancestry 
Afanasy Bagration was married to Ana Amilakhvari (Anna Vasilyevna; 10 April 1720 – 6 March 1794), also a Georgian expatriate noblewoman, a daughter of Prince Vakhtang (Vasily) Amilakhvari (died 1739) by his wife, Princess Elene Orbeliani. Afanasy and Ana had three children—Anton, Varvara, and Ana.

References 

1707 births
1784 deaths
Georgian princes
Russian people of Georgian descent
Imperial Russian Army generals
Recipients of the Order of St. Anna
Russian military personnel of the Seven Years' War
Illegitimate children of Levan of Kartli